Animal Cognition is a peer-reviewed scientific journal published by Springer Science+Business Media. It covers research in ethology, behavioral ecology, animal behavior, cognitive sciences, and all aspects of human and animal cognition. According to the Journal Citation Reports, the journal has a 2020 impact factor of 3.084.

References

External links

Ethology journals
English-language journals
Publications established in 1998
Springer Science+Business Media academic journals
Cognitive science journals
Animal cognition